The Lewin B. Barringer Memorial Trophy was established by the will of Lewin Barringer in 1948. The original rules specified that the trophy would be awarded for the longest distance soaring flight from any type of launching method other than airplane tow. The trophy would become the permanent property of any pilot who won it three times in succession.

History
Paul Bikle was the first pilot to win the Trophy three times in succession.  He subsequently donated the trophy back to the Soaring Society of America as a perpetual trophy.  In 1957 the SSA Directors, with Bikle's approval, changed the rules to allow for any type of launch method and include any flights, other than those flown at the US National Contest.

Recipients
Recipients of this trophy, from 1948 to present, include:

See also

 List of aviation awards

References

External links
Official website

Aviation awards
Gliding
Awards established in 1948